NASA Astronaut Group 15 ("The Flying Escargot") was a group of 23 NASA astronauts announced on December 8, 1994. Group members adopted The Flying Escargot as their moniker, in reference to two members of the group being from France. The group featured ten pilots, nine mission specialists, and four international mission specialist trainees from France, Canada and Japan.

Three members of this group, Rick Husband, Michael P. Anderson, and Kalpana Chawla,  died in the Space Shuttle Columbia disaster. These three received the Congressional Space Medal of Honor.

Another member of the group Pamela Melroy, currently serves as Deputy Administrator of NASA, taking office on June 21st 2021, having been appointed by US President Joe Biden.

Pilots
Scott Altman
Pilot, STS-90  (Neurolab)
Pilot, STS-106 
Commander, STS-109 
Commander, STS-125 
Jeffrey Ashby
Pilot, STS-93 
Pilot, STS-100 
Commander, STS-112 
Michael Bloomfield
Pilot, STS-86 
Pilot, STS-97 
Commander, STS-110 
Joe F. Edwards, Jr. 
Pilot, STS-89 
Dominic L. Pudwill Gorie 
Pilot, STS-91 
Pilot, STS-99 
Commander, STS-108 
Commander, STS-123 
Rick Husband 
Pilot, STS-96 
Commander, STS-107 *
Steven Lindsey
Pilot, STS-87 
Pilot, STS-95 
Commander, STS-104 
Commander, STS-121 
Commander, STS-133 
Pamela Melroy
Pilot, STS-92 
Pilot, STS-112 
Commander, STS-120 
Susan L. Still-Kilrain
Pilot, STS-83 
Pilot, STS-94 
Frederick Sturckow
Pilot, STS-88 
Pilot, STS-105 
Commander, STS-117 
Commander, STS-128

Mission Specialists
Michael P. Anderson 
Mission Specialist, STS-89 
Mission Specialist, STS-107 *
Kalpana Chawla 
Mission Specialist, STS-87 
Mission Specialist, STS-107 *
Robert Curbeam
Mission Specialist, STS-85 
Mission Specialist, STS-98 
Mission Specialist, STS-116 
Kathryn Hire
Mission Specialist, STS-90 
Mission Specialist, STS-130 
Janet Kavandi
STS-91 
STS-99 
STS-104 
Edward Tsang Lu
Mission Specialist, STS-84 
Mission Specialist, STS-104 
Flight Engineer, Soyuz TMA-2
Flight Engineer, Expedition 7
Carlos I. Noriega
Mission Specialist, STS-84 
Mission Specialist, STS-97 
James F. Reilly
STS-89 
STS-104 
STS-117 
Stephen Robinson 
STS-85 
STS-95 
STS-114 
STS-130

International mission specialists 
Jean-Loup Chrétien (France)
Research Cosmonaut, Soyuz T-6
Research Cosmonaut, Soyuz TM-6/TM-7 (Mir Aragatz)
Mission Specialist, STS-86  
Takao Doi (Japan)
Mission Specialist, STS-87 
Mission Specialist, STS-123 
Michel Tognini (France)
Research Cosmonaut, Soyuz TM-15/TM-14
Mission Specialist, STS-93 
Dafydd Williams (Canada)
Mission Specialist, STS-90 
Mission Specialist, STS-118

References

External links

NASA Astronaut Corps
Lists of astronauts
Kalpana Chawla